Benjamin Källman (born 17 June 1998) is a Finnish international footballer who plays as a forward for Cracovia and the Finland national team.

Club career
Born in Ekenäs, Källman has played for EIF and Inter Turku. In August 2018, he signed on loan for Scottish club Dundee, with an option to buy. On 30 January 2019, he was then loaned out to Vendsyssel FF in the Danish Superliga. In July 2019 he was loaned out to Viking FK in Norway.

On 2 July 2022, Källman moved to Polish side Cracovia on a three-year contract.

International career
Källman made his international debut for Finland in 2018.

Personal life
His father Mikael Källman is widely considered to be Finland's greatest handball player of all time.

Career statistics

Club

Notes

International goals
Scores and results list Finland's goal tally first.

Honours
Inter Turku
Finnish Cup: 2017–18

Viking
Norwegian Football Cup: 2019

References

External links

1998 births
Living people
Finnish footballers
Finland international footballers
Ekenäs IF players
FC Inter Turku players
Dundee F.C. players
Vendsyssel FF players
Viking FK players
FK Haugesund players
MKS Cracovia (football) players
Kakkonen players
Ykkönen players
Veikkausliiga players
Scottish Professional Football League players
Danish Superliga players
Eliteserien players
Ekstraklasa players
Association football forwards
Finnish expatriate footballers
Finnish expatriate sportspeople in Scotland
Expatriate footballers in Scotland
Finnish expatriate sportspeople in Denmark
Expatriate men's footballers in Denmark
Finnish expatriate sportspeople in Norway
Expatriate footballers in Norway
Finnish expatriate sportspeople in Poland
Expatriate footballers in Poland